Like a Version is a weekly segment on Australian youth radio station Triple J. It involves Australian and international artists playing two songs live in the Triple J studio, one of their own songs (an "original") and then a cover version, hence the name of the segment. The title is wordplay on the Madonna song "Like a Virgin".

It was created by Mel Bampton as part of the Mel in the Morning program.  The segment was later moved to Robbie Buck's Drive program, and then to the Breakfast Show. Due to the intimate nature of the presenters' studio, the performances in the segment's early years were often acoustic or otherwise stripped-back. In more recent years, however, the performances have been moved into a larger studio to allow for full-band performances. The segment has grown in popularity over the years, leading to the release of compilation CDs featuring the covers. Some particularly well-received covers have also made it into the Triple J Hottest 100. All Like a Version performances are filmed by Triple J and are made available on the Triple J website and YouTube channel.

Like a Version is comparable to BBC Radio 1's Live Lounge and Irish Today FM's Even Better Than the Real Thing.

Volume One (2005) 
23-track compilation CD released in 2005 by ABC Music.

Track listing:
 Grinspoon – "The Drugs Don't Work" (Richard Ashcroft)
 The Pictures – "Milkshake" (Pharrell Williams/Chad Hugo)
 Jebediah – "Raindrops Keep Fallin' on My Head" (Burt Bacharach/Hal David)
 Salmonella Dub – "Get Up, Stand Up" (Bob Marley/Peter Tosh)
 Speedstar – "There Is a Light That Never Goes Out" (Steven Morrissey/Johnny Marr)
 Little Birdy – "These Boots Are Made for Walkin'" (Lee Hazlewood)
 The Cat Empire – "Hotel California" (Don Felder/Don Henley/Glenn Frey)
 End of Fashion – "Quicksand" (David Bowie)
 Bertie Blackman – "Tyrone" (Erica Wright/N. Hurt)
 Goodshirt – "Gouge Away" (The Pixies)
 Love Outside Andromeda – "Andy Warhol" (David Bowie)
 Darren Hanlon – "Don't Stop" (Christine McVie)
 Damien Rice – "When Doves Cry"* (Prince)
 John Butler Trio – "Message in a Bottle" (Sting)
 Gorgeous – "Little Suicides" (Anton Fier/Lori Carson)
 Lazy Susan – "Are You Old Enough" (Paul Hewson)
 Betchadupa – "Sweet Dreams" (Philip Judd)
 Starky – "Show a Sign of Life" (Josh Malerman/Mark Owen)
 Serena Ryder – "Illegal Smile" (John Prine)
 Missy Higgins – "Moses" (Patty Griffin)
 Big Heavy Stuff – "Hyperballad" (Björk)
 Donavon Frankenreiter – "Stay Young" (Graham Lyle/Benny Gallagher)
 Clare Bowditch – "Hallelujah" (Leonard Cohen)

Track 13 by Damien Rice contains a portion of Led Zeppelin's "Babe I'm Gonna Leave You" (Anne Bredon/Jimmy Page & Robert Plant)

Volume Two (2006) 
22-track compilation CD released in 2006 by ABC Music.

Track listing:
 Gyroscope – "Monument" (Jebediah)
 The Herd – "I Was Only 19" (Redgum)
 Eels – "I Could Never Take the Place of Your Man" (Prince)
 Sophie Koh – "Creep" (Radiohead)
 Spoon – "Upwards at 45 Degrees" (Julian Cope)
 Sarah Blasko – "Goodbye Yellow Brick Road" (Elton John)
 The Drones – "Words from a Woman to Her Man" (Beasts of Bourbon)
 Lior – "The Needle and the Damage Done" (Neil Young)
 Holidays on Ice – "The Holiday Song" (The Pixies)
 Crooked Fingers – "Long Black Veil" (Lefty Frizzell/Johnny Cash)
 Tegan and Sara – "Dancing in the Dark" (Bruce Springsteen)
 Evermore – "Relapse" (Little Birdy)
 Holly Throsby – "Mistress" (Red House Painters)
 67 Special – "Scar" (Missy Higgins)
 Live@Subs – "Rolled Up" (Long Beach Dub Allstars)
 Mia Dyson – "Can't Let Go" (Lucinda Williams)
 The Panda Band – "My Mistake" (Split Enz)
 The Mountain Goats – "Wild World" (The Birthday Party)
 Kate Miller-Heidke – "Little Water Song" (Ute Lemper/Nick Cave/Bruno Pisek)
 The Tea Party – "The Maker" (Daniel Lanois)
 New Buffalo – "Don't Let Me Be Misunderstood" (Nina Simone)
 Willy Mason – "The Way I Am" (Merle Haggard)

Volume Three (2007) 
20-track compilation CD and 10 video DVD released in 2007 by ABC Music

Track listing – CD:
 Ben Folds – "Such Great Heights" (The Postal Service)
 Sharon Jones – "This Land Is Your Land" (Woody Guthrie)
 Eskimo Joe – "Hey" (Pixies)
 Josh Pyke – "House at Pooh Corner" (Nitty Gritty Dirt Band)
 The Magic Numbers – "Crazy in Love" (Beyoncé)
 Bob Evans – "Beautiful to Me" (Little Birdy)
 Mattafix – "Boulevard of Broken Dreams" (Green Day)
 The Bellrays – "Highway to Hell" (AC/DC)
 Shout Out Louds – "Streams of Whiskey" (The Pogues)
 Pivot – "Woman" (Wolfmother)
 Custom Kings – "The Boys of Summer" (Don Henley)
 SubAudible Hum – "Africa" (Toto)
 Gomez – "Breakfast in America" (Supertramp)
 Blue King Brown – "You Don't Love Me (No, No, No)" (Dawn Penn)
 The Kill Devil Hills – "Look at Miss Ohio" (Gillian Welch)
 The Zutons – "Runaway" (Del Shannon)
 Macromantics – "Jump" (Kris Kross)
 Broken Social Scene – "Kennel District" (Pavement)
 Angus & Julia Stone – "Tubthumping" (Chumbawamba)
 Something for Kate – "Rock the Casbah" (The Clash)

Track listing – DVD:
 Ben Folds – "Such Great Heights" (The Postal Service)
 Eskimo Joe – "Hey" (Pixies)
 Bob Evans – "Beautiful to Me" (Little Birdy)
 The Bellrays – "Highway to Hell" (AC/DC)
 Custom Kings – "The Boys of Summer" (Don Henley)
 Gomez – "Breakfast in America" (Supertramp)
 Blue King Brown – "You Don't Love Me (No, No, No)" (Dawn Penn)
 The Kill Devil Hills – "Look at Miss Ohio" (Gillian Welch)
 Macromantics – "Jump" (Kris Kross)
 Something for Kate – "Rock the Casbah" (The Clash)

Volume Four (2008) 
19-track compilation CD and 14 video DVD released in 2008 by ABC Music.

Track listing – CD:
 Regina Spektor – "Real Love" (John Lennon)
 Katalyst feat. Stephanie McKay – "Hang Me Up to Dry" (Cold War Kids)
 The Panics – "Wide Open Road" (The Triffids)
 C. W. Stoneking – "Seven Nation Army" (The White Stripes)
 British India – "And I Was A Boy From School" (Hot Chip)
 Plan B – "Stop Me If You Think You've Heard This One Before" (The Smiths)
 Crowded House – "Everybody's Talkin''" (Harry Nilsson)
 Saosin – "Time After Time" (Cyndi Lauper)
 Lou Rhodes – "Satellite" (Elliott Smith)
 Dappled Cities – "More Than a Woman" (Bee Gees)
 Bit by Bats – "Orinoco Flow" (Enya)
 After The Fall – "Only the Good Die Young" (Billy Joel)
 Paul Kelly – "Rehab" (Amy Winehouse)
 Snowman – "Strange Fruit" (Billie Holiday)
 The Veils – "State Trooper" (Bruce Springsteen)
 Nouvelle Vague – "Ever Fallen in Love (With Someone You Shouldn't've)" (Buzzcocks)
 Jamie T – "Hoover Street" (Rancid)
 Little Barrie – "White Light/White Heat" (The Velvet Underground)
 Émilie Simon – "I Wanna Be Your Dog" (The Stooges)

Track listing – DVD:
 Regina Spektor – "Real Love" (John Lennon)
 Katalyst feat. Stephanie McKay – "Hang Me Up To Dry" (Cold War Kids)
 The Panics – "Wide Open Road" (The Triffids)
 British India – "And I Was A Boy From School" (Hot Chip)
 Plan B – "Stop Me If You Think You’ve Heard This One Before" (The Smiths)
 Crowded House – "Everybody's Talkin’" (Harry Nilsson)
 Saosin – "Time After Time" (Cyndi Lauper)
 Lou Rhodes – "Satellite" (Elliott Smith)
 Dappled Cities – "More Than A Woman" (Bee Gees)
 After The Fall – "Only The Good Die Young" (Billy Joel)
 Tilly and the Wall – "Kiss Off" (Violent Femmes)
 C. W. Stoneking – "Seven Nation Army" (The White Stripes)
 Snowman – "Strange Fruit" (Billie Holiday)
 Nouvelle Vague – "Ever Fallen In Love (With Someone You Shouldn't've)" (Buzzcocks)

Volume Five (2009) 
20-track compilation CD and 14-track DVD released in November 2009 by ABC Music.

Track listing – CD:
 The Kooks – "Kids" (MGMT)
 Bob Evans – "Not Fair" (Lily Allen)
 Ben Harper & Relentless7 – "Under Pressure" (Queen and David Bowie)
 Lisa Mitchell – "Romeo and Juliet" (Dire Straits)
 Sparkadia – "This Boy's in Love" (The Presets)
 Urthboy – "London Calling" (The Clash)
 Philadelphia Grand Jury – "99 Problems" (Jay-Z)
 Little Birdy – "Do Right Woman" (Aretha Franklin)
 Whitley – "Dancing Queen" (ABBA)
 TZU – "Heavy Heart" (You Am I)
 The Drones – "Suicide Is Painless" (Johnny Mandel – theme from M*A*S*H)
 The Wombats – "There She Goes" (The La's)
 Tiki Taane – "Use Somebody" (Kings of Leon)
 Liam Finn & EJ Barnes – "Old Man" (Neil Young)
 Bertie Blackman – "In the Air Tonight" (Phil Collins)
 Bluejuice – "Every Little Step" (Bobby Brown)
 Kisschasy – "Alex Chilton" (The Replacements)
 Mat McHugh & The Blackbird – "Only You"  (Yazoo)
 Hermitude – "Joga" (Björk)
 Holly Throsby – "Berlin Chair" (You Am I)

Track listing – DVD:
 Bob Evans – "Not Fair" – (Lily Allen)
 Little Birdy – "Do Right Woman" (Aretha Franklin)
 The Cat Empire – "Sunny Afternoon" (The Kinks)
 Dananananaykroyd – "Whip It" (Devo)
 Holly Throsby – "Berlin Chair" (You Am I)
 The Kooks – "Kids" (MGMT)
 Mia Dyson – "This Magic Moment" (Lou Reed)
 Liam Finn & EJ Barnes – "Old Man" (Neil Young)
 Ben Harper & Relentless7 – "Under Pressure" (Queen and David Bowie)
 Tiki Taane – "Use Somebody" (Kings Of Leon)
 Lisa Mitchell – "Romeo & Juliet" (Dire Straits)
 Sparkadia – "This Boy's in Love" (The Presets)
 Urthboy – "London Calling" (The Clash)
 Philadelphia Grand Jury – "99 Problems" (Jay-Z)

Weekly charts

Volume Six (2010) 
21-track compilation CD and 16-track DVD released in October 2010 by ABC Music

Track listing – CD:
 The Temper Trap – "Dancing In The Dark" (Bruce Springsteen)
 Basement Birds – "My People" (The Presets)
 Grizzly Bear – "Boy from School" (Hot Chip)
 Washington – "Santeria" (Sublime)
 Mumford & Sons – "Unfinished Business" (White Lies)
 The Last Kinection – "Rhythm Is a Dancer" (Snap!)
 John Butler Trio – "I Want You Back" (The Jackson 5)
 Yves Klein Blue – "Walk On The Wild Side" (Lou Reed)
 Jonathan Boulet – "Colour Television" (Eddy Current Suppression Ring)
 Old Man River – "Clap Your Hands" (Sia)
 Jen Cloher & Jordie Lane – "Electric Feel" (MGMT)
 Darren Hanlon – "Together in Electric Dreams" (Philip Oakey)
 Band of Skulls – "Strict Machine" (Goldfrapp)
 Space Invadas – "Sweet Disposition" (The Temper Trap)
 OK Go – "Wave of Mutilation" (The Pixies)
 Alexisonfire – "(I'm) Stranded" (The Saints)
 Cloud Control – "Pursuit Of Happiness" (Kid Cudi)
 The Boat People – "Bulletproof" (La Roux)
 Grinspoon – "When You Were Mine" (Prince)
 Miami Horror – "The Logical Song" (Supertramp)
 Regina Spektor – "No Surprises" (Radiohead)

Track listing – DVD:
 Basement Birds – "My People" (The Presets)
 Yves Klein Blue – "Walk On The Wild Side" (Lou Reed)
 Jonathan Boulet – "Colour Television" (Eddy Current Suppression Ring)
 Old Man River – "Clap Your Hands" (Sia)
 Jen Cloher & Jordie Lane – "Electric Feel" (MGMT)
 Darren Hanlon – "Together in Electric Dreams" (Philip Oakey)
 Band of Skulls – "Strict Machine" (Goldfrapp)
 Space Invadas – "Sweet Disposition" (The Temper Trap)
 OK Go – "Wave of Mutilation" (The Pixies)
 Alexisonfire – "(I'm) Stranded" (The Saints)
 Cloud Control – "Pursuit Of Happiness" (Kid Cudi)
 The Boat People – "Bulletproof" (La Roux)
 Miami Horror – "The Logical Song" (Supertramp)
 Regina Spektor – "No Surprises" (Radiohead)
 Ernest Ellis – "New York, I Love You, But You're Bringing Me Down" (LCD Soundsystem)
 The Soft Pack – "Hang Fire" (The Rolling Stones)

Weekly charts

Year-end charts

Certifications

Volume Seven (2011) 
23-track compilation CD and 15-track DVD released in November 2011 by ABC Music.

Track listing – CD:
 Owl Eyes – "Pumped Up Kicks" (Foster the People)
 Plan B – "Runaway" (Kanye West)
 Art vs. Science – "Harder, Better, Faster, Stronger" (Daft Punk)
 Andy Bull – "Everybody Wants to Rule the World" (Tears for Fears)
 Busby Marou – "Girls Just Want to Have Fun" (Cyndi Lauper)
 Sarah Blasko – "Hey Ya!" (OutKast)
 Dialectrix – "Buy Me A Pony" (Spiderbait)
 Kaiser Chiefs – "Record Collection" (Mark Ronson & the Business Intl.)
 Stonefield – "Magic Carpet Ride" (Steppenwolf)
 Angus & Julia Stone – "Say It Right" (Nelly Furtado)
 Eskimo Joe – "Somebody That I Used to Know" (Gotye & Kimbra)
 Children Collide – "Reckless" (Australian Crawl)
 Adalita – "Burning Up" (Madonna)
 The Vines – "Clint Eastwood" (Gorillaz)
 Eagle and the Worm – "Tightrope" (Janelle Monáe & Big Boi)
 The Kills – "One Silver Dollar" (Marilyn Monroe)
 Oh Mercy – "Evil Woman" (Electric Light Orchestra)
 Gossling – "Dance the Way I Feel" (Ou Est le Swimming Pool)
 Paul Dempsey – "Daniel" (Bat For Lashes)
 Calling All Cars – "Don't Sit Down 'Cause I've Moved Your Chair" (Arctic Monkeys)
 The Beards – "Sharp Dressed Man" (ZZ Top)
 Sally Seltmann – "You're So Vain" (Carly Simon)
 The Seabellies – "Am I Ever Gonna See Your Face Again?" (The Angels)

Track listing – DVD:
 Owl Eyes – "Pumped Up Kicks" (Foster the People)
 Plan B – "Runaway" (Kanye West)
 Art vs. Science – "Harder, Better, Faster, Stronger" (Daft Punk)
 Andy Bull – "Everybody Wants to Rule the World" (Tears for Fears)
 Sarah Blasko – "Hey Ya!" (OutKast)
 Dialectrix – "Buy Me A Pony" (Spiderbait)
 Stonefield – "Magic Carpet Ride" (Steppenwolf)
 Angus & Julia Stone – "Say It Right" (Nelly Furtado)
 Eskimo Joe – "Somebody That I Used To Know" (Gotye & Kimbra)
 Children Collide – "Reckless" (Australian Crawl)
 Adalita – "Burning Up" (Madonna)
 The Vines – "Clint Eastwood" (Gorillaz)
 Oh Mercy – "Evil Woman" (Electric Light Orchestra)
 Paul Dempsey – "Daniel" (Bat for Lashes)
 Sally Seltmann – "You're So Vain" (Carly Simon)

Weekly charts

Year-end charts

Certifications

Volume Eight (2012) 
21-track compilation CD and 14-track DVD released in October 2012 by ABC Music.

Track listing – CD:
 Bluejuice – "Video Games" (Lana Del Rey)
 Hilltop Hoods – "So What'cha Want" (Beastie Boys)
 Boy & Bear – "Walking on a Dream" (Empire of the Sun)
 City and Colour – "Settle Down" (Kimbra)
 Missy Higgins – "Hearts a Mess" (Gotye)
 Electric Guest – "Ritual Union" (Little Dragon)
 Austra – "None Of Dem" (Robyn)
 Husky – "Need You Tonight" (INXS)
 Jinja Safari – "Ignition (Remix)" (R. Kelly)
 Josh Pyke – "Endless Summer" (The Jezabels)
 The Herd feat. Radical Son, Nooky & Sky'High – "A Change Is Gonna Come" (Sam Cooke)
 Matt Corby – "Lonely Boy" (The Black Keys)
 Julia Stone – "Feeding Line" (Boy & Bear)
 Deep Sea Arcade – "Let Forever Be" (The Chemical Brothers)
 Jebediah – "Apartment" (Custard)
 Ladyhawke – "White Rabbit" (Jefferson Airplane)
 Bon Iver – "Coming Down" (Anaïs Mitchell)
 Active Child – "Sweet Dreams (Are Made of This)" (Eurythmics)
 Cosmo Jarvis – "Spinning Around" (Kylie Minogue)
 Thundamentals – "Brother" (Matt Corby)
 The Medics – "Blowin' in the Wind" (Bob Dylan)

Track listing – DVD :
 Thundamentals – "Brother" (Matt Corby)
 Bluejuice – "Video Games" (Lana Del Rey)
 Matt Corby – "Lonely Boy" (The Black Keys)
 Missy Higgins – "Hearts a Mess" (Gotye)
 Ball Park Music – "Do You Realize??" (The Flaming Lips)
 Hilltop Hoods – "So What'cha Want" (Beastie Boys)
 City and Colour – "Settle Down" (Kimbra)
 Austra – "None Of Dem" (Robyn)
 The Herd feat. Radical Son, Nooky & Sky'High – "A Change Is Gonna Come" (Sam Cooke)
 Bon Iver – "Coming Down" (Anaïs Mitchell)
 Julia Stone – "Feeding Line" (Boy & Bear)
 Jinja Safari – "Ignition (Remix)" (R. Kelly)
 The Maccabees – "Girl, You'll Be a Woman Soon" (Neil Diamond)
 Lanie Lane – "Gold on the Ceiling" (The Black Keys)

Weekly charts

Year-end charts

Certifications

Volume Nine (2013) 
20-track compilation CD and 20-track DVD released in October 2013 by ABC Music.

Track listing – CD:
 Something for Kate – "Sweet Nothing" (Calvin Harris)
 San Cisco – "Get Lucky" (Daft Punk)
 Emma Louise – "Tessellate" (Alt-J)
 Vance Joy – "Rolling in the Deep" (Adele)
 Hermitude {ft. Elana Stone} – "Get Free" (Major Lazer)
 HAIM – "Strong Enough" (Sheryl Crow)
 Tame Impala – "Prototype "(Outkast)
KINGSWOOD – "Wolf" (First Aid Kit)
 Seth Sentry – "Punch In The Face" (Frenzal Rhomb)
 Abbe May – "Pony" (Ginuwine)
 Bonjah – "Royals" (Lorde)
Tuka – "I'm Into You" (Chet Faker)
 The Bamboos – "Lost" (Frank Ocean)
 Jimblah – "Resolution" (Matt Corby)
 Ash Grunwald {ft. Urthboy and Scott Owen & Andy Strachan from The Living End} – "Feel Good Inc." (Gorillaz)
 Chance Waters – "Little Lion Man" (Mumford & Sons)
 The Trouble with Templeton – "The District Sleeps Alone Tonight" (The Postal Service)
 FIDLAR – "Red Right Hand" (Nick Cave and the Bad Seeds)
 Spit Syndicate – "Latch" (Disclosure)
 Little Green Cars – "To The Last" (James Blake)

Track listing – DVD:
 Something for Kate – "Sweet Nothing" (Calvin Harris)
 San Cisco – "Get Lucky" (Daft Punk)
 Emma Louise – "Tessellate" (Alt-J)
 Vance Joy – "Rolling In The Deep" (Adele)
 Hermitude {ft. Elana Stone} – "Get Free" (Major Lazer)
 HAIM – "Strong Enough" (Sheryl Crow)
 Tame Impala – "Prototype "(Outkast)
 KINGSWOOD – "Wolf" (First Aid Kit)
 Seth Sentry – "Punch In The Face" (Frenzal Rhomb)
 Abbe May – "Pony" (Ginuwine)
 Bonjah – "Royals" (Lorde)
 Angus Stone – "Hold On" (Alabama Shakes)
 Tuka – "I'm Into You" (Chet Faker)
 The Bamboos – "Lost" (Frank Ocean)
 Jimblah – "Resolution" (Matt Corby)
 Ash Grunwald {ft. Urthboy and Scott Owen & Andy Strachan from The Living End} – "Feel Good Inc." (Gorillaz)
FIDLAR – "Red Right Hand" (Nick Cave and the Bad Seeds)
 Chance Waters – "Little Lion Man" (Mumford & Sons)
 Asta – "Holdin On" (Flume)
 Little Green Cars – "To The Last" (James Blake)

Weekly charts

Year-end charts

Certifications

Volume Ten (2014) 
19-track compilation CD and 25-track DVD released in October 2014 by ABC Music.

Track listing – CD:
Chvrches – "Do I Wanna Know?" (Arctic Monkeys)
John Butler Trio – "Happy" (Pharrell Williams)
Chet Faker – "(Lover) You Don't Treat Me No Good" (Sonia Dada)
Alex Turner – "Feels Like We Only Go Backwards" (Tame Impala)
Karnivool – "Hey Now" (London Grammar)
RÜFÜS – "My Number/Charlotte" (Foals/Booka Shade)
First Aid Kit – "Love Interruption" (Jack White)
Glass Animals – "Love Lockdown" (Kanye West)
REMI – "Since I Left You" (The Avalanches)
The Jezabels – "Don't Stop Believin'" (Journey)
The Delta Riggs – "Gooey" (Glass Animals)
Meg Mac – "Bridges" (Broods)
James Vincent McMorrow – "West Coast" (Lana Del Rey)
Northeast Party House – "Covered In Chrome" (Violent Soho)
Saskwatch – "Let Her Go" (Jagwar Ma)
Dan Sultan – "Southern Sun" (Boy & Bear)
Ásgeir – "Stolen Dance" (Milky Chance)
Illy – "Ausmusic Month Medley" (Silverchair, Hilltop Hoods, Paul Kelly, & Flume)
 Lorde – "Retrograde" (James Blake)

Track listing – DVD:
Alex Turner – "Feels Like We Only Go Backwards" (Tame Impala)
Chvrches – "Do I Wanna Know?" (Arctic Monkeys)
Chet Faker – "(Lover) You Don't Treat Me No Good" (Sonia Dada)
Karnivool – "Hey Now" (London Grammar)
Illy – "Ausmusic Month Medley" (Silverchair, Hilltop Hoods, Paul Kelly, & Flume)
The Jezabels – "Don't Stop Believin'" (Journey)
Ásgeir – "Stolen Dance" (Milky Chance)
Dan Sultan – "Southern Sun" (Boy & Bear)
First Aid Kit – "Love Interruption" (Jack White)
Glass Animals – "Love Lockdown" (Kanye West)
REMI – "Since I Left You" (The Avalanches)
James Vincent McMorrow – "West Coast" (Lana Del Rey)
 Lorde – "Retrograde" (James Blake)
John Butler Trio – "Happy" (Pharrell Williams)
Northeast Party House – "Covered In Chrome" (Violent Soho)
Meg Mac – "Bridges" (Broods)
Briggs (ft. Gurrumul) – "The Children Came Back"
RÜFÜS – "My Number/Charlotte" (Foals/Booka Shade)
Saskwatch – "Let Her Go" (Jagwar Ma)
The Rubens – "Friday on My Mind" (The Easybeats)
The Delta Riggs – "Gooey" (Glass Animals)
Robert DeLong – "The Mother We Share" (Chvrches)
L-FRESH The LION – "Fresh Prince of Bel-Air/Beware" (Fresh Prince of Bel-Air/Panjabi MC)
The Smith Street Band – "History Eraser" (Courtney Barnett)
Franz Ferdinand – "Was There Anything I Could Do?" (The Go-Betweens)

Weekly charts

Year-end charts

Certifications

Volume Eleven (2015)
40-track compilation CD released on 2 October 2015 by ABC Music.

Track listing – CD:
Disc 1

Thelma Plum – Gold (Chet Faker)
The Wombats – Do You Remember (Jarryd James)
Ball Park Music – Diane Young (Vampire Weekend)
Foals – Daffodils (Mark Ronson)
Montaigne – Chandelier (Sia)
#1 Dads – Two Weeks feat. Tom Snowdon (FKA twigs)
Dustin Tebbutt – Young Folks (Peter Bjorn and John)
Gang of Youths – All My Friends (LCD Soundsystem)
One Day – Not Many (Scribe)  
Little May – Great Southern Land (Icehouse)
Dorsal Fins - Pash (Kate Ceberano)
 Kilter - Ice Cream feat. ((Ngaiire)) (Muscles) 
 I Know Leopard - Waterfalls (TLC)
 The Belligerents - Praise You (Fatboy Slim)
 Client Liaison- Party/! (The Song Formerly Known As) (Christine Anu)/(Regurgitator)
 The Griswolds- Riptide (Vance Joy)
 Hiatus Kaiyote- Dare (Gorillaz)
 Jarryd James- Say It Ain't So (Weezer)
 Boo Seeka - Pilgrim (MØ)
 Jebediah- Go (The Chemical Brothers)

Disc 2
 Mark Ronson - I Sat by the Ocean (Queens of the Stone Age)
 SAFIA - Left Hand Free (alt-J)
 Vance Joy - Fake Plastic Trees (Radiohead)
 Highasakite - Heavenly Father (Bon Iver)
 Peking Duk - Can't Get You Out of My Head (Kylie Minogue)
 Catfish and the Bottlemen - Read My Mind (The Killers)
 Mansionair - Seasons (Waiting on You) (Future Islands)
 Tired Lion - Saramona Said/1979 (Violent Soho/The Smashing Pumpkins)
 Sticky Fingers - Delete (DMA's)
Carmada - Lean On (Major Lazer)
 Asta - I Wanna Dance with Somebody (Who Loves Me) feat. Allday (Whitney Houston)
Holy Holy - Love Will Tear Us Apart (Joy Division)
 Philly - Three Little Birds (Bob Marley and the Wailers)
 The Grenadiers - Vitriol (Bluejuice)
 Jesse Davidson - Sober (Childish Gambino)
 Lisa Mitchell - Zombie (Jamie T)
 Rudimental - Ready or Not (Fugees)
 Kim Churchill - Just For You (Sticky Fingers)
 Milky Chance - Shake It Off (Taylor Swift)
 Bluejuice - End of the Road (Boyz II Men)

Weekly charts

Year-end charts

Certifications

Volume Twelve (2016) 
39-track compilation CD released on 7 October 2016 by ABC Music.

Track listing – CD:
Disc 1

Broods – One Dance (Drake)
The Rubens – King Kunta/Hello (Kendrick Lamar/Adele)
Tame Impala – Confide in Me (Kylie Minogue)
Childish Gambino – So Into You (Tamia)
E^ST – Bitter Sweet Symphony (The Verve)
Cub Sport – Ultralight Beam  (Kanye West)
Luca Brasi – How to Make Gravy (Paul Kelly)
Urthboy – Roll Up Your Sleeves (Meg Mac)
Sarah Blasko – Life On Mars (David Bowie)  
In Hearts Wake – Vice Grip (Parkway Drive)
The Temper Trap - Multi-Love (Unknown Mortal Orchestra)
Vera Blue - Breathe Life  (Jack Garratt) 
Tuka - Big Jet Plane (Angus & Julia Stone)
Modern Baseball- Dope Calypso (Violent Soho)
Ayla- Throw Your Arms Around Me (Hunters & Collectors)
The Cat Empire- Get Some (Lykke Li)
Yeo- Forces (Japanese Wallpaper)
Ngaiire- The Less I Know the Better (Tame Impala)
Jake Bugg- If I Could Change Your Mind (Haim)
Grouplove- Bullshit (Dune Rats)

Disc 2
Paces feat. Guy Sebastian- Keeping Score (L D R U)
Drapht- Frankie Sinatra (The Avalanches) 
MS MR- Genghis Khan (Miike Snow)
Boy & Bear- Back to Black (Amy Winehouse)
The Murlocs- Every 1’s a Winner (Hot Chocolate)
Airling- U Got It Bad (Usher)
Art vs. Science- Enter Sandman (Metallica)
Claptone- How Deep Is Your Love? (The Rapture)
Dylan Joel- You've Got a Friend in Me (Randy Newman)
Bad Dreems- Can't Feel My Face (The Weeknd)
Anne-Marie- Listen to Soul, Listen to Blues (Safia) 
Methyl Ethel- Cry Me A River (Justin Timberlake)
City Calm Down- Spanish Sahara- (Foals)
Alpine- Cigarettes Will Kill You (Ben Lee)
Robbie Miller- Say My Name (Odesza) 
The Jungle Giants- Lights & Music (Cut Copy)
Raury- L$D (ASAP Rocky)
Olympia- Dreams (Beck) 
Art Of Sleeping- Hotline Bling (Drake)

Weekly charts

Year-end charts

Certifications

Volume Thirteen (2017) 
38-track compilation CD released on 6 October 2017 by ABC Music.

Track listing – CD:
Disc 1

DMA's - Believe (Cher)
Northeast Party House - Redbone (Childish Gambino)
Haim - That Don't Impress Me Much (Shania Twain)
Holy Holy - Hold Up (Beyoncé)
Flume featuring Vince Staples, Kučka, Vera Blue and Ngaiire - My Boo (Ghost Town DJ's)
The Jezabels - If You Go (Sticky Fingers)
Matt Corby - Chains (Tina Arena)
Slumberjack featuring K.Flay - Paper Planes (M.I.A.)
Violent Soho - Lazy Eye (Silversun Pickups)
Glass Animals - Crazy (Gnarls Barkley)
Vallis Alps - New Slang (The Shins)
Horrorshow - No Aphrodisiac (The Whitlams)
Camp Cope - Maps (Yeah Yeah Yeahs)
Paul Dempsey - Edge Of Town (Middle Kids)
Milky Chance - I'm Like a Bird (Nelly Furtado)
Maggie Rogers - Say Something Loving (The xx)
M-Phazes - Weathered (Jack Garratt)
PUP - You Don't Get Me High Anymore (Phantogram)
Alex Lahey - Torn (Natalie Imbruglia)
Julia Jacklin - Someday (The Strokes)

Disc 2
A.B. Original featuring Paul Kelly and Dan Sultan - Dumb Things (Paul Kelly)
Elk Road featuring Lisa Mitchell - Crave You/The Less I Know the Better (Flight Facilities/Tame Impala)
Amy Shark - Miss You Love (Silverchair)
Kingswood - Say My Name (Destiny’s Child)
Ta-ku featuring Wafia - Leave (Get Out) (JoJo)
Bishop Briggs - Monday (Matt Corby)
Polish Club - Never Be like You (Flume)
sleepmakeswaves - Children (Robert Miles)
Emma Louise- Into My Arms (Nick Cave and the Bad Seeds)
Margaret Glaspy - Let Me Love You (DJ Snake & Justin Bieber)
Ásgeir - Love$ick (Mura Masa & ASAP Rocky)
Birdz - Djäpana (Sunset Dreaming) (Yothu Yindi)
AURORA - Teardrop (Massive Attack)
Big Scary - Come As You Are (Nirvana)
Winston Surfshirt - 21 Questions (50 Cent)
Kasabian - Insane in the Brain (Cypress Hill)
Middle Kids - Don't Dream It's Over (Crowded House)
Tash Sultana - Electric Feel (MGMT)

Weekly charts

Volume Fourteen (2018) 
39-track compilation CD released on 19 October 2018 by ABC Music.

Track listing – CD:
Disc 1

Gang Of Youths - Blood (The Middle East)
Chvrches - LOVE. (Kendrick Lamar)
Ball Park Music - My Happiness (Powderfinger)
Ocean Alley - Baby Come Back (Player)
Meg Mac - Let It Happen (Tame Impala)
Phoenix - No Woman (Whitney)
The Kooks - Feel It Still (Portugal. The Man)
Joyride - Since U Been Gone (Kelly Clarkson)
Angus & Julia Stone - Passionfruit (Drake)
Dean Lewis - Mended (Vera Blue)
Eves Karydas - (You Make Me Feel Like) A Natural Woman (Aretha Franklin)
Wolf Alice - Boys (Charli XCX)
Thundamentals - Ivy (Frank Ocean)
Lanks - Numb (Hayden James)
Tia Gostelow - We Are The People (Empire of the Sun)
B Wise - Under The Bridge (Red Hot Chili Peppers)
West Thebarton - You've Got The Love (Florence & The Machine)
Grinspoon - Get Out (Chvrches)
Alex the Astronaut - If I Could Start Today Again (Paul Kelly)

Disc 2
Odette - Magnolia (Gang Of Youths)
Tonight Alive - Affirmation (Savage Garden)
Loyle Carner - Gimme The Mic (George Benson)
Crooked Colours - Suga Suga (Baby Bash)
Press Club - When You Were Young (The Killers)
Gordi - In the End (Linkin Park)
Billie Eilish - Bad (Michael Jackson)
Ziggy Alberts - Juke Jam (Chance The Rapper)
Slum Sociable - Somebody To Love Me (Mark Ronson & The Business Intl.)
Sløtface - Supercut (Lorde)
Tired Lion - Death To The Lads (The Smith Street Band)
GoldLink - Frontin' (Pharrell Williams)
The Preatures - Everything Now (Arcade Fire)
Tove Styrke - Loving Is Easy (Rex Orange County)
Kuren - Unforgettable (French Montana)
Cloud Control - Dreams (The Cranberries)
Nothing But Thieves - What Can I Do If The Fire Goes Out? (Gang Of Youths)
Superorganism - Congratulations (MGMT) and  Congratulations (Post Malone)
Woodes - Lay It On Me (Vance Joy)
George Maple - We Found Love (Calvin Harris & Rihanna)

Weekly charts

Volume Fifteen (2019)
42-track compilation CD released on 18 October 2019 by ABC Music.

Track listing – CD:
Disc 1

Denzel Curry - Bulls On Parade (Rage Against the Machine)
Amy Shark - Be Alright (Dean Lewis)
Adrian Eagle - Confidence (Ocean Alley)
Holy Holy - Green Light (Lorde)
Aurora - Across the Universe (The Beatles)
Ceres - A Thousand Miles (Vanessa Carlton)
Allday & The Veronicas - Big Yellow Taxi (Joni Mitchell)
Pond - Ray Of Light (Madonna)
Glades - Straight Lines (Silverchair)
Skegss - Here Comes Your Man (Pixies)
Hilltop Hoods - Can't Stop (Red Hot Chili Peppers)
Cosmo's Midnight feat. Asta - Sing It Back (Moloko)
Lily Allen - Deep End (Lykke Li)
Kwame - Alright (Kendrick Lamar)
DZ Deathrays feat. The Gooch Palms - Love Shack (The B-52's)
Graace - Complicated (Avril Lavigne)
San Cisco - 4Ever (Clairo)
Fidlar - xanny (Billie Eilish)
SAFIA - No One Knows (Queens Of The Stone Age)
Jack River - Truly Madly Deeply (Savage Garden)
Yungblud feat. Halsey - I Will Follow You into the Dark (Death Cab for Cutie)

Disc 2
Thelma Plum - Young Dumb & Broke (Khalid)
Vance Joy - Elastic Heart (Sia)
Charli XCX - Don't Delete the Kisses (Wolf Alice)
Dear Seattle - The Special Two (Missy Higgins)
Kira Puru - Last Friday Night (T.G.I.F.) (Katy Perry)
The Presets - Power & The Passion (Midnight Oil)
Laurel - Happy Man (Jungle)
Cub Sport - when the party's over (Billie Eilish)
Brockhampton - Un-Thinkable (I'm Ready) (Alicia Keys)
Ruby Fields - The Unguarded Moment (The Church)
Hockey Dad feat. Hatchie - I Try (Macy Gray)
Thandi Phoenix - Glory Box (Portishead)
Hein Cooper - The Fear (Lily Allen)
Clea - Nothing Breaks Like a Heart (Mark Ronson & Miley Cyrus)
Slowly Slowly - Skinny Love (Bon Iver)
Broods - My Old Man (Mac Demarco)
The Herd - Bodies (Wafia)
Nicole Millar - Reborn (Kids See Ghosts)
King Princess - Fell In Love With A Girl (The White Stripes)
Parcels - I Will Always Love You (Dolly Parton)
The Wombats - White Christmas (Bing Crosby)

Weekly charts

Volume Sixteen (2020)
40-track compilation CD released on 23 October 2020 by ABC Music / Universal Music Australia.

Track listing – CD: Disc 1
 Alex Lahey – "Welcome to the Black Parade" (My Chemical Romance)
 Lime Cordiale – "I Touch Myself" (Divinyls)
 Taka Perry featuring A Girl, Emalia, and Gia Vorne – "Jesus Walks" (Kanye West)
 Eves Karydas – "Painkiller" (Ruel)
 Polish Club – "Say So" (Doja Cat)
 Childish Gambino – "Lost In You" (Chris Gaines)
 Angie McMahon – "Knowing Me, Knowing You" (ABBA)
 Hermitude featuring Jaguar Jonze – "Heart-Shaped Box" (Nirvana)
 Bugs – "Charlie" (Mallrat)
 Milky Chance – "Dance Monkey" (Tones and I)
 Benee – "Mile High" (James Blake featuring Travis Scott and Metro Boomin)
 Gordi – "Wrecking Ball" (Miley Cyrus)
 Hauskey – "Mr. Brightside" (The Killers)
 Dominic Fike – "Bags" (Clairo)
 Stella Donnelly – "Love Is in the Air" (John Paul Young)
 Kim Churchill – "Don't Know How to Keep Loving You" (Julia Jacklin)
 Jimblah – "What's Going On" (Marvin Gaye)
 The Naked and Famous – "Blinding Lights" (the Weeknd)
 Gengahr – "Everything I Wanted" (Billie Eilish)
 Northlane – "Get Free" (The Vines)

Disc 2:
 G Flip featuring Thandi Phoenix, JessB, Jess Kent, Isabella Manfredi, Rosie Fitzgerald, Alex the Astronaut, Clio Renner, Kate Richards, Bernice Tasara and Carla Dobbie – "Lady Marmalade" (Christina Aguilera, Lil' Kim, Mýa and Pink)
 Fergus James – "Soaked" (Benee)
 Azure Ryder – "Don't Start Now" (Dua Lipa)
 Chillinit featuring Lil Dijon – "Sugar" (Brockhampton)
 Stand Atlantic – "Righteous" (Juice Wrld)
 Japanese Wallpaper – "California" (Phantom Planet)
 Leikeli47 – "No Diggity" (Blackstreet featuring Dr. Dre and Queen Pen)
 Alex the Astronaut – "Mr. Blue Sky" (Electric Light Orchestra)
 Petit Biscuit – "1901" (Phoenix)
 Nilufer Yanya – "Super Rich Kids" (Frank Ocean featuring Earl Sweatshirt)
 The Vanns – "Hey, Ma" (Bon Iver)
 Wafia – "My My My!" (Troye Sivan)
 Jarryd James – "When the War Is Over" (Cold Chisel)
 Maddy Jane – "Unwritten" (Natasha Bedingfield)
 Mickey Kojak – "Parlez Vous Francais?" (Art vs. Science)
 Of Monsters and Men – "Circles" (Post Malone)
 Becca Hatch – "Burn for You" (John Farnham)
 Bad//Dreems featuring Peter Garrett, Mambali and Emily Wurramara – "Blackfella/Whitefella" (Warumpi Band)
 Yours Truly – "Don't Look Back In Anger" (Oasis)
 Tones And I – "Forever Young" (Alphaville)

Weekly charts

References

External links
 Like a Version on Triple J website
 Like a Version playlist on Triple J's YouTube channel

2005 compilation albums
2006 compilation albums
2007 compilation albums
2008 compilation albums
2009 compilation albums
2005 live albums
2006 live albums
2007 live albums
2008 live albums
2009 live albums
Covers albums
Triple J programs